OIS may refer to:

Computing 
 Object Oriented Input System, a cross-platform input system
 Objective Interface Systems, a communications software and hardware company
 Optical IP Switching, a computer optical network architecture
 Optical image stabilization, a technique to reduce motion-related blurring by an imaging system

Education 
 Oxford International School (Panama), an international school in Panama City, Panama
 Oeiras International School, an international school in Oeiras (suburb of Lisbon), Portugal
 Oulu International School, an international school in Oulu, Finland
 Organised Independents (OIs), an interest group within the National Union of Students (UK)
Oberoi International School, an international school in Mumbai, India

Other science related 
 Ops in Surgery, The St George's Surgical Society, an academic society at St George's University
 Oncogene-Induced Senescence, a mechanism in cell biology
 Ocular ischemic syndrome, a medical condition which blocks arterial blood flow to the eye
 Oxygen isotope stages, alternating warm and cool periods in the Earth's paleoclimate

Other 
 Officer-involved shooting, an incident in which a police officer shoots at another person
 Örgryte IS, a Swedish sports club based in Gothenburg
 Overnight indexed swap, a type of interest rate swap